DC/DS/DI Raymond Milton "Ray" Carling is a fictional character in BBC One's science fiction/police procedural drama, Life on Mars and its spin-off Ashes to Ashes.

Storylines

Life on Mars

Ray Carling is shown to be similar in character to his boss, DCI Gene Hunt. During Life on Mars, Carling often prefers Hunt's brutality and corruption over DI Sam Tyler's ideas. Carling has also been described by the BBC's website as Hunt's "right-hand man when it comes to fighting, shooting, gambling and the ladies".

Throughout the series, Carling frequently clashes with Sam Tyler regarding his policing methods. It is revealed that Carling had applied for promotion to DI (Detective Inspector), but was passed over for the apparently transferred Sam Tyler, fuelling his grudge against Tyler.

During episode 7 of the first series, Billy Kemble is arrested on drug-related charges. In an attempt to make him reveal his supplier, Carling and Chris Skelton force-feed Kemble cocaine, but Kemble has a heart attack and dies in police custody. After an extensive cover-up operation, Hunt angrily demotes Carling to DC (Detective Constable).

After a period of time as a DC, Hunt re-promotes Carling to DS in series 2, episode 1, which he remains at for the next decade until 1983 in Ashes to Ashes.

During episode 3 of the second series, Carling is blown up by a car bomb and hospitalized. A short time before the explosion, Sam Tyler claims it is a hoax and not the IRA as he knows from 2006 that they never used dynamite. Carling believes Tyler and investigates, only to be caught in the explosion. He suffers severe posttraumatic stress disorder after his release from hospital and unwittingly compromises Tyler's investigations. He is, however, hailed a hero by the rest of CID.

During series 2 he drove a Morris Marina.

Ashes to Ashes

Alongside Gene Hunt and Chris Skelton, Carling moved from Manchester to London and joined the Metropolitan Police shortly after the death of Sam Tyler in 1980.

Despite Carling openly being racist and sexist during Life on Mars, he is consistently displayed to have an improved attitude throughout Ashes to Ashes. Unlike his disdain for DI Tyler in 1973, he forms a good working relationship with DI Alex Drake and, most of the time, fully respects her authority over him, despite her gender.

During the third series in 1983, Carling is promoted to a DI while Hunt is on the run for Drake's shooting, and takes overall charge of CID. When Hunt returns with Drake, he hastily disregards and lampoons Carling's efforts, describing him as looking like a "maths teacher". Carling goes on to ruin a stake-out during a hostage situation, but after the case is solved, Hunt acknowledges that it was a difficult operation and finally applauds his ability and effort.

It is also revealed that Ray's father and grandfather were in the army, but Ray never joined himself as he went out drinking on the night he was supposed to sign up and never got around to going because he was scared, his relationship with his father subsequently souring despite his successes in the force. In series 2 in 1982, Carling actually fills out an army application form, but when he asks Alex Drake to write a reference, she takes the form and rips it up into little pieces, convincing him to stay.

Ray, along with Shaz and Chris, endures visions of stars and space and hears strange voices, like that of in a pub, and described by Chris as Nelson (Tony Marshall), the publican from Life on Mars, asking him what is he having to drink. Although he initially dismisses it as alcohol-related, he is eventually brought round by Shaz and the three of them share the vision together in the street outside Luigi's.

He drives a MkII Ford Granada 2.8S.

Finale
Along with Chris and Shaz, it is revealed that Ray Carling had previously died in the real world. As a young DC, he had been struggling with the feeling that he had failed his father and grandfathers, who were all army sergeants, after he failed basic training for entry to the Army. Ray took out his frustrations on a drunk young man outside a pub and ended up killing him, something which his DCI covered up. Ridden with guilt, he committed suicide by hanging himself in a bout of severe depression and alcohol abuse, on 6 May 1972, the day of that year's FA Cup Final.

Personality
The character displays homophobic, racist and sexist attitudes throughout Life on Mars. During Life on Mars, Carling has little respect for Sam Tyler, due to their disagreements over policing methods and Tyler's getting the job to which Carling hoped to be promoted. In Episode 5 of series 1, Carling is shown to be a big Manchester United fan, even faking an illness in order to get time off work to attend the Manchester derby match.

By 1981, when the first series of Ashes to Ashes is set, Carling resents having a female superior, DI Alex Drake and is still sexist and opposed to having women in CID. However, during the second and third series he is much more willing to work with Drake and respects her as his senior officer and equal colleague.

During series 2, it is revealed that Carling is a Freemason, and holds the rank of Tyler. He notes the ironic nature of the title.

References

External links
 Ray Carling (Ashes to Ashes)
 Ray Carling (Life on Mars)
 Ray Carling (Internet Movie Database)
 BBC Press Office Series 3

Fictional British police detectives
Fictional people from Manchester
Life on Mars (TV series) characters
Ashes to Ashes (TV series) characters
Television characters introduced in 2006
Fictional suicides